Istyak (İstäk) is a rural locality (a selo) and the administrative centre of Istyaksky Selsoviet, Yanaulsky District, Bashkortostan, Russia. The population was 425 as of 2010. There are 7 streets.

Geography 
Istyak is located 8 km east of Yanaul (the district's administrative centre) by road. Yanaul is the nearest rural locality.

References 

Rural localities in Yanaulsky District